Sandra Dee (born Alexandra Zuck; April 23, 1942 – February 20, 2005) was an American actress. Dee began her career as a child model, working first in commercials, and then film in her teenage years. Best known for her portrayal of  ingénues, Dee earned a Golden Globe Award as one of the year's most promising newcomers for her performance in Robert Wise's Until They Sail (1958). She became a teenage star for her performances in Imitation of Life and Gidget (both 1959), which made her a household name.

By the late 1960s, her career had started to decline, and a highly publicized marriage to Bobby Darin ended in divorce. The year of her divorce, Dee's contract with Universal Pictures was dropped. She attempted a comeback with the 1970 independent horror film The Dunwich Horror, but rarely acted after this time, appearing only occasionally in television productions throughout the 1970s and early 1980s. The rest of the decade was marred by alcoholism, mental illness, plus near total reclusiveness, particularly after her mother died in 1988. Afterwards she sought medical and psychological help in the early 1990s, and died in 2005 of complications from kidney disease, brought on by lifelong anorexia nervosa.

Life and career

1942–1951: Early life
Dee was born Alexandra Zuck on April 23, 1942, in Bayonne, New Jersey, the only child of John Zuck and Mary ( Cimboliak) Zuck, who met as teenagers at a Russian Orthodox Church dance. They married shortly afterward, but divorced before Dee was five years old. She was of Carpatho-Rusyn ancestry  and raised in the Orthodox faith; her son, Dodd Darin, wrote in his biographical book about his parents titled Dream Lovers that Dee's mother Mary and her aunt Olga [later Olga Duda] "were first generation daughters of a working-class Russian Orthodox couple", and Dee recalled, "we belonged to a Russian Orthodox church, and there was dancing at the social events." 
She soon adopted the name Sandra Dee, becoming a professional model by the age of four and progressing to television commercials.

There has been some dispute as to Dee's actual birth year, with evidence pointing to both 1942 and 1944. Legal records, including her California divorce record from Bobby Darin, as well as the Social Security Death Index and her own cryptstone all give her year of birth as 1942. In a 1967 interview with the Oxnard Press-Courier, she acknowledged being 18 in 1960 when she first met Darin, whom she wed three months later. 

According to her son's book, Dee was born in 1944, but, having begun modeling and acting at a very young age, she and her mother falsely inflated her age by two years in order that she could find more work. However, given that the cryptstone her own family ordered gives 1942 as her year of birth, this is unlikely.

Dee's parents divorced in 1950, and her mother married real estate executive Eugene "Gene" Douvan, who reportedly sexually abused Dee after he married her mother.

1952–1956: Modeling career
Producer Ross Hunter claimed to have discovered Dee on Park Avenue in New York City with her mother when she was 12 years old. In a 1959 interview, Dee recalled that she "grew up fast," surrounded mostly by older people, and was "never held back in anything [she] wanted to do."

During her modeling career, Dee attempted to lose weight to "be as skinny as the high-fashion models," although an improper diet "ruined [her] skin, hair, nails—everything." Having lost weight, her body was unable to digest any food that she ate, and it took the help of a doctor to regain her health. According to Dee, she "could have killed [herself]" and "had to learn to eat all over again." 

Despite the damaging effects on her health, Dee earned $75,000 in 1956 working as a child model in New York, which she used to support herself and her mother after the death of her stepfather in 1956. According to sources, Dee's large modeling salary was more than what she would later earn as an actress. While modeling in New York, she attended the Professional Children's School.

1957–1958: Early films and Universal contract
Ending her modeling career, Dee moved from New York to Hollywood in 1957. She graduated from University High School in Los Angeles in June 1958, aged 16. Her onscreen debut was in the 1957 MGM film Until They Sail, directed by Robert Wise. To promote the film, Dee appeared in a December issue of Modern Screen in a column by Louella Parsons, who praised Dee and compared her appearance and talent to those of Shirley Temple. Dee's performance made her one of that year's winners of the Golden Globe Award for New Star of the Year – Actress.

MGM cast Dee as the female lead in The Reluctant Debutante (1958), with John Saxon as her romantic costar. It was the first of several films in which Dee appeared with Saxon. She provided the voice of Gerda for the English dub of The Snow Queen (1957). With her newfound success and the effects of sexual abuse, Dee continued to struggle with anorexia nervosa, and her kidneys temporarily failed.

In 1958, Dee signed with Universal Pictures and was one of the company's last contract players prior to the dissolution of the studio system. She had a lead role in The Restless Years (1958) for producer Ross Hunter, opposite Saxon and Teresa Wright. She followed this with another film for Hunter, A Stranger in My Arms (1959).

1959–1965: Stardom

Dee's third film for Hunter was of greater impact than the first two: Imitation of Life (1959), starring  Lana Turner. 

The film became a box-office success, grossing more than $50 million. It was the highest-grossing film in Universal's history and made Dee a household name. She was loaned to Columbia Pictures to play the title role in the teenage beach comedy Gidget (1959), which was a solid hit, helping spawn the beach party genre and leading to two sequels, two television series and two television movies (although Dee did not appear in any of these).

Universal next cast Dee as a tomboy opposite Audie Murphy in the Western romantic comedy The Wild and the Innocent (1959). Warner Bros. borrowed her for another melodrama in the vein of Imitation of Life, A Summer Place (1959), opposite Troy Donahue as her romantic costar. The film was a massive hit, and that year American box office exhibitors voted Dee the 16th-most popular star in the country.

Hunter reunited Dee with Turner and Saxon in Universal's Portrait in Black (1960), a thriller that was a financial success despite receiving harsh reviews. Dee was listed as the nation's seventh-greatest star at the end of 1960. Peter Ustinov cast her as the lead in the Cold War comedy Romanoff and Juliet (1961) with Universal's new heartthrob John Gavin, reuniting them from Imitation of Life.

Dee and Gavin played together again in Hunter's popular Tammy Tell Me True (1961), in which Dee took the Tammy role originated by Debbie Reynolds. In Come September (1961), she worked with Bobby Darin in his film debut (following a cameo in an earlier film). Dee and Darin married after filming on December 1, 1960. On December 16, 1961, she gave birth to their son, her only child, Dodd Mitchell Darin (also known as Morgan Mitchell Darin).

In 1961, Dee, with three years remaining on her Universal contract, signed a new one for seven years. Dee and Darin appeared together in the Hunter romantic comedy If a Man Answers (1962). In 1963, she appeared in the final Tammy film, Tammy and the Doctor, and the hit comedy Take Her, She's Mine, playing a character loosely based on Nora Ephron. That year, she was voted the eighth-greatest star in the country, but it was her last appearance in the top 10. Dee appeared in I'd Rather Be Rich (1964), a musical remake of It Started with Eve, once again for Hunter. She was reunited with Darin in That Funny Feeling (1965) before appearing in her last film at Universal under her contract with the spy comedy A Man Could Get Killed (1966).

Dee was also a singer and recorded some singles in the early 1960s, including a cover version of "When I Fall in Love".

1966–1983: Career decline and later roles

By the end of the 1960s, Dee's career had slowed significantly, and she was dropped by Universal Pictures. She rarely acted following her 1967 divorce from Darin. In a 1967 interview with Roger Ebert, she reflected on her experience in the studio system and on the ingénue image that had been foisted on her, which she found constricting:Look at this––[a] cigarette. I like to smoke. I'm 25 years old, and it so happens that I like to smoke. So out in Hollywood the studio press agents are still pulling cigarettes out of my hand and covering my drink with a napkin whenever my picture is taken. Little Sandra Dee isn't supposed to smoke, you know. Or drink. Or breathe.

Dee appeared in the somewhat successful Doctor, You've Got to Be Kidding! in 1967. Hunter asked her to return to Universal in a co-starring role in Rosie! (1967), but the film was not a success. Dee was inactive in the film industry for several years before appearing in the 1970 American International Pictures occult horror film The Dunwich Horror—a loose adaptation of an H.P. Lovecraft story—as a college student who finds herself in the center of an occult ritual plot. Dee later said, "The reason I decided to do Dunwich was because I couldn't put the script down once I started reading it. I had read so many that I had to plow through, just because I promised someone. Even if this movie turns out be a complete disaster, I guarantee it will change my image." However, she refused to appear nude in the film's final sequence that had been written in the screenplay.

Throughout the 1970s, Dee took sporadic guest-starring roles on episodes of several television series, such as Night Gallery, Fantasy Island and Police Woman. Her final film performance occurred in the low-budget drama Lost (1983). In her later years, Dee told a newspaper that she "felt like a has-been that never was."

1984–2005: Later life and retirement
Dee's years in the 1980s were marked by poor health, and she became a self-described recluse after retiring from acting. At one point, she finally confronted her mother about the sexual abuse by her stepfather when she was a child, as well as her mother's obliviousness to it. She said: 
One night I couldn't control the pressure any longer. My mother and I were at home with a few of her close friends, and she started eulogizing my stepfather. I was slowly getting more and more irate. Finally I said, "Mom, shut up. A saint he wasn't." My mother started defending him, and I said, "Well, guess what your saint did to me? He had sex with me." My mother was shocked, then angry. I knew I hurt her. I wanted to. I had so much anger toward her for not doing something to help me. But she ignored me, and the subject never came up again. I realize now that my mother erased the abuse from her own mind. It didn't exist, so she didn't have to feel guilty.

Dee battled anorexia nervosa, depression and alcoholism for many years, hitting a low point after her mother died of lung cancer on December 27, 1987, at age 63. Dee stated that for months she became a recluse living on soup, crackers and Scotch, with her body weight falling to only 80 pounds. After she began to vomit blood, her son compelled her to seek medical and psychiatric treatment. Her mental and physical condition improved, and she expressed a desire to appear in a television situation comedy, partly in order to belong to a family. She stopped drinking altogether after she was diagnosed with kidney failure in 2000, which was attributed to years of heavy drinking and smoking.
 
In 1994's Dream Lovers: The Magnificent Shattered Lives of Bobby Darin and Sandra Dee, Dodd Darin chronicled his mother's anorexia and drug and alcohol problems, stating that she had been sexually abused as a child by her stepfather Eugene Douvan. The same year, Dee's final acting credit occurred with a voice-only appearance on an episode of Frasier.

Death

After requiring kidney dialysis for the last four years of her life, complications from kidney disease led to Dee's death on February 20, 2005, at the Los Robles Hospital & Medical Center in Thousand Oaks, California, at the age of 62. She was interred in a crypt at Forest Lawn Memorial Park Cemetery in the Hollywood Hills.

Filmography

Film

Television

Accolades

Box-office ranking
For a number of years, exhibitors voted Dee one of the most popular box-office stars in the United States:
 1959—16th
 1960—7th
 1961—6th
 1962—9th
 1963—8th

In popular culture

Dee is referenced in the song "Look at Me, I'm Sandra Dee" from the 1971 musical Grease and its 1978 film adaptation.

References

Sources

External links

 Sandra Dee – The Carpathian Connection
 
 
 
 
 
 Profile of Sandra Dee; accessed March 24, 2014.

1942 births
2005 deaths
20th-century American actresses
Actresses from Los Angeles
Actresses from New Jersey
American child models
American child actresses
American film actresses
American television actresses
Deaths from kidney failure
Actors from Bayonne, New Jersey
American people of Rusyn descent
Russian Orthodox Christians from the United States
Burials at Forest Lawn Memorial Park (Hollywood Hills)
New Star of the Year (Actress) Golden Globe winners
University High School (Los Angeles) alumni
21st-century American women